Barry Lumb is a former professional rugby league footballer who played in the 1970s. He played at club level for the Stanley Rangers ARLFC, and Wakefield Trinity (Heritage No. 789), as a goal-kicking , i.e. number 2 or 5.

Playing career

Club career
Barry Lumb made his début for Wakefield Trinity during March 1973, and he played his last match for Wakefield Trinity during the 1975–76 season, he appears to have scored no drop-goals (or field-goals as they are currently known in Australasia), but prior to the 1974–75 season all goals, whether; conversions, penalties, or drop-goals, scored 2-points, consequently prior to this date drop-goals were often not explicitly documented, therefore '0' drop-goals may indicate drop-goals not recorded, rather than no drop-goals scored.

References

External links
Search for "Lumb" at rugbyleagueproject.org
Stanley Rangers ARLFC - Roll of Honour
Players Register A Z Pdf
Summer 2015 Newsletter
July 2016 Newsletter Semi Final Special Part 1
July 2016 Newsletter Semi Final Special Part 2
July 2016 Newsletter Semi Final Special Part 3
July 2016 Newsletter Semi Final Special Part 4

Living people
English rugby league players
Place of birth missing (living people)
Rugby league wingers
Wakefield Trinity players
Year of birth missing (living people)